Moses Effiong (born 4 October 1959) is a Nigerian former footballer who played for the Nigerian national football team as a goalkeeper. He won the 1980 African Cup of Nations tournament while representing Nigeria.

Honours

International
 1980 African Cup of Nations – 1980
 WAFU Cup – 1983
 WAFU Cup – 1984

References

1959 births
Living people
Shooting Stars S.C. players
1980 African Cup of Nations players
Africa Cup of Nations-winning players
Nigerian footballers
Sharks F.C. players
Olympic footballers of Nigeria
Footballers at the 1980 Summer Olympics
Association football goalkeepers